SS Burdigala was an ocean liner that sailed the Atlantic Ocean from 1898 until World War I. The ship was built as the Kaiser Friedrich in 1898 for Norddeutscher Lloyd (NDL), a German shipping line. Designed to break the speed record for a transatlantic liner and thereby win the Blue Riband, the Kaiser Friedrich never achieved the necessary speeds. After a short career with NDL and an equally short period of service with NDL's main German competitor, the Hamburg-Amerikanische Packetfahrt-Aktien-Gesellschaft (Hamburg America Line, or HAPAG), the ship was mothballed for a decade. After being sold to the French shipping line Compagnie de Navigation Sud-Atlantique, it re-entered service as SS Burdigala. In 1916, while  from Thessaloniki to Toulon, the liner struck a mine laid by the German U-boat U-73 in the Aegean Sea and sank near Kea, Greece.

Construction and design 

Soon thereafter, the company ordered a second "Atlantic greyhound" from the Schichau-Werke shipyard in Danzig, Germany. The goal of cementing their control of the Blue Riband was built into the terms of the contract NDL signed with Schichau.

Kaiser Friedrich, built by Schichau as Number 587, was powered by two quadruple-expansion reciprocating steam engines that drove two three-blade propellers. These five-cylinder engines were fed by ten boilers, whose fumes were exhausted through three large funnels. The entire plant was designed to generate  at full power. Contrary to common shipbuilding practices of the era, the engineers placed the engines slightly forward, between the second and third boilers. The boilers were grouped into three separate watertight compartments.

By the end of her completion, the 21,000-ton Kaiser Friedrich had cost £525,000, surpassing by far the initial budgeted cost. The flush-deck design, coupled with relatively low freeboard and a long forecastle were distinctive, as was the ship's curvilinear bridge. In addition to these features, Kaiser Friedrich (like some other German steamers of her time) was designed and constructed to operate as an armed merchant cruiser in the event of war, being intended to serve as an ancillary unit in the Kaiserliche Marine.

A floating palace 

All the 180 first-class and 111 second-class cabins were placed on higher decks, offering their occupants remarkable views. Some of the first-class cabins were also convertible into large seating areas. In addition to the 420 crew, the ship could accommodate 1,350 passengers out of which 400 in first class, 250 in second and 700 passengers in third-class. Like the most sumptuous transatlantic ships of her time, the Kaiser Friedrichs main dining and living rooms were lit by extravagant Chandeliers and the surrounding walls dominated by the hanging Caryatids representing the art and sciences and decorated with painted panels portraying Kaiser Friedrich III's family and their respective coat of arms. The walls were painted in a shade of ivory, adorned by gold ornaments, while the carpets were all red. The most prominent feature though was the ship's promenade deck, especially in the first class areas where the deck was open so as not to obstruct the view and extended along the highest point of the ship's admit for 100 meters. The ship was also equipped with smoking lounges, bars, music room and a library.

Short maiden voyage 
The construction work was completed in May 1898 and the Kaiser Friedrich embarked on its maiden voyage on 12 May 1898 from Danzig to Bremerhaven, the home port of Norddeutscher Lloyd. During the sea trials, the engineers of NDL, which were present on board, discovered with disappointment that even with the greatest of efforts she could only reach the speed of 20 knots and by no means exceed it.

Upon the ship's arrival at the port and due to its poor performance with respect to the low speed she had achieved during the trials, the NDL categorically denied receiving the ship, adhering strictly to the explicit terms of the contract. Only after F. Schichau had confirmed that he would significantly improve the ship's speed and performance did the NDL agree to include the Kaiser Friedrich in its fleet, planning its first transatlantic voyage from Bremerhaven to Southampton and from there onward to New York City.

Improvements 
Since both companies had titles of ownership of the ship, one can say with certainty that they were both interested in finding a solution for the speed problems. The fact that the larger share of ownership, 62% belonged to F. Schichau, which at that point was trying to penetrate the global shipping market, combined with the explicit terms of the contract that made the return of the NDL ship not only possible but also likely in case it deviated from the terms of agreement, brought F. Schichau in a rather difficult and defenseless position.

In order to preserve the prestige of the company, it was essential that a solution should be found, a solution satisfactory to all. The first step involved sending the ship off to Southampton where it underwent some "structural adjustments" whose principal objective was to improve the speed. The ship remained for several days in the dry dock yards "Prince of Wales", during which time the length of its two propeller blades was shortened by 30 cm. On 1 June 1898 the ship sailed back to Bremerhaven.

Maiden voyage to New York 
On 7 June 1898, the SS Kaiser Friedrich began its sea journey from Bremen to Southampton under the helm of an experienced NDL captain, Ludwig A. Störmer. The next day, on 8 June 1898, the ship's first transatlantic trip to New York City commenced, carrying 209 passengers in the first and second classes, and 183 in the third, of which the majority were immigrants.

The journey had started off well, but very quickly the bad weather and a number of mechanical problems significantly reduced the speed of the ship. Afterwards, the left engine ceased operating for 20 hours and 26 minutes, shortly followed by the right engine, which stopped running for 11 hours and 42 minutes. Fortunately for the passengers and the crew, the engines halted separately, not simultaneously. The cause of mechanical problems was later considered by ship specialists to be overheating of bearings or as it was formally stated in The Marine Engineer Magazine "the failure of the slide valves to work smoothly and to the breakage of studs on the air pump brackets, so that a proper vacuum could not be maintained".

The result was disastrous: it took 7 days, 10 hours and 15 minutes for the SS Kaiser Friedrich to cover the classic route from Southampton to Sandy Hook, New York City, where it arrived on 16 June 1898. Further hours of delay were added to its already poor time count, owing to the fact that the ship had to stay outside the New York City harbor and wait for entry allowance because of the mines that were placed to guard the harbour after the outbreak of the Spanish–American War in April 1898.

The next day, the NDL hosted a press conference in the ship's foyer, which was attended by media representatives, shipbuilders, engineers and ship-owners. As publicized by The New York Times in an article dated 17 June 1898 and headlined "The Kaiser Friedrich – The Fine Big Steamship Makes Her Maiden Trip in Over Seven Days – Engines Easily Overheated", the average vessel speed during its first transatlantic crossing was 17.73 knots, pointing out that "nobody knows the actual maximum speed of the vessel", as the average speed had been lowered due to mechanical problems.

Return home and future voyages 
On 25 June 1898, the SS Kaiser Friedrich set off on her return voyage, without passengers, which lasted 9 days, 2 hours and 30 minutes to Southampton. Given the very low average speed of 15 knots and a new set of mechanical problems which arose again during her return, the NDL cancelled Kaiser Friedrichs next two scheduled trips and the ship was sent to F. Schichau's shipyard in Danzig for repairs, always with the aim to improve her speed limit to exceed 20 and reach 22 knots. On 4 September 1898 the ship was given back to the NDL.

On 14 September 1898, Kaiser Friedrich embarked on her second transatlantic trip from Southampton to New York City, where she arrived after 6 days and 12 hours on 21 September 1898, traveling at an average speed of 19–20 knots. The corrections made by F. Schicha's engineers slightly improved the ship's speed performance, but not enough to cover the most important term of the contract which had set the service speed of the ship at 22 knots.

Over the next three journeys SS Kaiser Friedrich had sailed by the end of travel season in December 1898, the speed remained at these levels without significant change. In the winter of 1898–99 the ship remained for three months at Schichau's shipyard in Danzig for corrections and repairs, always with the aim to increase its service speed. In addition to installing new air pumps in the engine and boiler rooms, the three funnels were extended by 4.5 meters resulting in a noticeable change in appearance.

With the start of the new season, the mended ship set off to its first transatlantic voyage in the year 1899, from Southampton to New York City on 5 March 1898. The crossing, which took 7 days and 40 minutes before reaching the Sandy Hook lighthouse, after the ship had lost two blades from its propellers, extinguished the last bit of hope that the ship with any new changes would ever approach the 22 knot threshold.

Because the NDL did not own any other ship of Kaiser Friedrichs size, to cover the gap which Kaiser Friedrichs removal from their fleet would cause, and also because the NDL did not want to return a ship 38% owned by them to the manufacturers, they patiently decided they would give Schichau's engineers yet another chance to finally put it right. Eight more transatlantic trips followed, the shortest of which was 6 days, 22 hours and 30 minutes which finally and irrevocably classified the ship as belonging to the 19 knots class.

NDL's farewell 
After all Norddeutscher Lloyd's patience had been worn off, on 27 June 1899, during the ship's return from New York City, the company returned SS Kaiser Friedrich back to its manufacturer on a formal ground that the ship did not cover the term of the contract which set its service speed at 22 knots. At the same time NDL ordered a new ship, bigger and faster but with the (tested) specifications same as those of SS Kaiser Wilhelm der Grosse, by the A.G. Vulcan.

Immediately after the delivery of the new ship, a long legal battle between the NDL and the Schichau Company had begun, which ended in 1908 with Norddeutscher Lloyd's victory. The press of the time, from both sides of the Atlantic, was widely involved in this unprecedented event. The New York Times in their article dated 28 June 1899, captioned "Kaiser Friedrich Rejected", extensively analyses the underlying facts and causes. The general manager of F. Schichau, vigorously objected to the court decision, claiming that the culprit was the poor quality of coal used as fuel by the NDL. On 7 August 1899, he wrote a letter to the Chief Editor of the renowned magazine "The Marine Engineer", which reads:

Dear Sir, In your esteemed journal of 1 August, page 207, you write that the KAISER FRIEDRICH has been withdrawn by the Norddeutscher Lloyd from service and returned to her builders. This not being the fact, I request you kindly to rectify it, in the next issue of your esteemed journal, according to the following data: – The KAISER FRIEDRICH was the property of the firm of F. Schichau, and in spite of her built as a high speed passenger steamer, requiring a good quality of coal, the Norddeutscher Lloyd mostly gave her a very inferior coal – besides, many of the stokers had no previous experience. Under these circumstances it could not give surprise that the KAISER FRIEDRICH was not able to develop her full speed, and there was no other way for the firm of F. Schichau but to withdraw its steamer and give her into other hands. The KAISER FRIEDRICH will make her next voyages under the flag of the Hamburg America Line. Reiterating to you in advance my best thanks for this rectification,

I remain, dear Sir,

Yours very respectfully F. Schichau

Hamburg-America Line 
The announcement by F. Schichau Shipyards that "the Kaiser Friedrich will make its next journeys under the flag of HAPAG (Hamburg America Line)" marked the beginning of the second chapter of later to be renamed SS Burdigala'''s history.

In 1898 HAPAG had sold one of its oceangoing ships, the SS Normannia, to the Spanish government which was used as an Auxiliary cruiser by the name SS Patriota during the Spanish–American War. This sale created a gap in the company's transatlantic fleet at a time when business was thriving, as the second wave of mass immigration to America had reached its peak. Furthermore, because of the Spanish-American and the Second Anglo-Boer war in South Africa, a number of American and British ships had been pulled out of the North Atlantic route, creating in turn a considerable void in shipping.

This shortage of ships became a tremendous opportunity for German and French maritime companies, ready to reap enormous profits by covering the gap. HAPAG was the first to try to exploit this opportunity, but the absence of SS Normannia had been evident given, that its three major ocean vessels could not satisfy the increased demand. In order to fill this gap, while waiting to add the  into its fleet, HAPAG decided to charter SS Kaiser Friedrich from the Schichau Company and include it immediately in its express line connecting Hamburg to Southampton, Cherbourg and New York City.

On 2 October 1899, SS Kaiser Friedrich embarked on its first transatlantic voyage under the HAPAG colors with a red flag and the City of Hamburg coat of arms on her bow, departing from Southampton for New York City. Towards the end of the journey, the ship went off course and ran aground near the coast of New Jersey but without damage. Soon after her return to Europe a second passage on the same route followed, which ended with the ship's homecoming to Southampton, on 16 November 1899.

During the winter 1899/1900, Kaiser Friedrich remained in Hamburg where repairs were undertaken by the well-known shipyards of Blohm & Voss, mainly for increasing the number of cabin passengers, as well as its cargo capacity. At the start of the new travel season, on 30 March 1900, the ship set off from Southampton to New York City. This departure marked the beginning of the most stable and successful period of the liner's operating life, since HAPAG was not interested in breaking speed records and since taking delivery of SS Deutschland was soon expected, the speed of Kaiser Friedrich was deemed more than sufficient by the company.

 Kaiser Friedrichs further career 
Over the next seven months, the ship had completed eight full transatlantic trips (Europe-America and back), between Plymouth and New York City, out of which most of the eastbound crossings took less than 7 days to complete. Kaiser Friedrichs best performance was recorded during its journey back from New York City to Plymouth, in August 1900, which lasted 6 days and 11 hours.

On 30 June 1900, after her fourth passage, the ship arrived at the HAPAG quay at Hoboken, New Jersey, where the docks of Norddeutscher Lloyd were also located. Her arrival coincided with the great fire of Hoboken during which many of NDL's ships were destroyed, among them SS Kaiser Wilhelm der Grosse, which was not completely burned but had suffered major damages. It was a tragic incident with many victims and enormous financial losses. During the fire, Kaiser Friedrich participated in several rescue operations rendering crucial assistance. The newspapers of the time, as well as the official shipping records, make explicit references about the heroism of her crew.

In July 1900, the eagerly awaited SS Deutschland, built by the A.G. Vulcan shipyards, made its maiden voyage under the HAPAG flag from Hamburg to New York City. Within few months she had won the Blue Riband speed trophy, reaching an average speed of 23 knots, thus taking the lead away from NDL's SS Kaiser Wilhelm der Grosse. HAPAG's dynamic entry into the higher class of transatlantic shipping, also meant the termination of SS Kaiser Friedrichs charter. Although the F. Schichau company had hoped, that after her successful integration into the Hamburg America Line's fleet they would proceed with the ship's purchase, HAPAG had other plans and decided to expand its fleet by building new ships.

 Hamburg-America Line's farewell 
In October 1900, SS Kaiser Friedrich departed for her last transatlantic crossing from New York City to Hamburg where she arrived in November of that year; the ship was subsequently returned to her owner F. Schichau who in turn decommissioned her, remaining mothballed at the port of Hamburg for the next 12 years. Despite the fact that SS Kaiser Friedrich was a beautifully built ship, with a service speed perfectly satisfactory to meet the requirements of most shipping routes, the negative reputation which had been created around her name, as well as her failure to fulfill the purpose for which she had been built, caused her abandonment and eventually a misfortune that she most likely did not deserve.

There is no doubt that the failure of SS Kaiser Friedrich to meet the term of the contract with NDL, which explicitly required that the vessel would reach the speed of 22 knots, was detrimental to the image of F. Schichau shipyards. Although the Norddeutscher Lloyd had ordered the construction of five new ships of around 6,000 GRT from the company to cover the Australian and Far East Lines and perhaps with the aim to alleviate the tension caused by their legal battle, the first large order from HAPAG was placed only about 10 years after the Kaiser Friedrich, in 1908, who ordered a middle-class 16,300 GRT vessel named .

Characteristic for the tarnished reputation and the financial damage caused by the failure of the Kaiser Friedrich is the fact that in a commemorative album called "Die Schichau-Werke in Elbing, Danzig und Pillau 1837–1912", which F. Schichau issued in 1912 to celebrate the company's 75th anniversary, there is no reference whatsoever about Kaiser Friedrich. Only after a couple of years in the company's history book did a small reference of the ship appear, under her new name SS Burdigala, as a memory of the F. Schichau's lost opportunity to truly play a part in the worldwide shipping

 Inactive years and purchase by Sud-Atlantique 
The SS Kaiser Friedrich remained mothballed in the harbor of Hamburg until 1910. This was a period when a newly formed Norwegian company, the Norwegian American Line (Norske Amerikalinje), was experiencing difficulties in trying to raise the initial capital essential for its establishment. The F. Schichau Company made a proposal to Norske to become a shareholder, promising to provide them with the capital they needed to survive, if they would agree to purchase the Kaiser Friedrich. The proposal was accepted and the agreement reached a point where Norske gave the ship the name of SS Leif Eriksson, in honor of the Icelandic explorer of the 10th century. Unfortunately for Schichau, at the last minute Norske decided not to purchase the Kaiser Friedrich, preferring to await the completion of ships they had already ordered. Two more years had passed before a solution was found, a solution that finally made Kaiser Friedrich active again. Her salvation was called Compagnie de Navigation Sud Atlantique and came from France in 1912, marking the beginning of the third period of the ship's history.

In March and April 1912, Sud- Atlantique was indispensable to acquire a large, fast and impressive ship, which would reveal the aspirations of the company and stress its authority. They found all which had been looking for in the SS Kaiser Friedrich, which they purchased from the F. Schichau on 1 May 1912 for 4,000,000 French Francs, an amount considered to reflect one third of the ship's actual value. The ship was renamed SS Burdigala, in accordance with the practice of Sud-Atlantique to give its ships ancient Latin names such as Lutetia for Paris, Gallia for France and Burdigala for the city of Bordeaux, which was its base. According to maritime history expert Arnold Kludas, SS Burdigala was converted at the Blohm & Voss shipyards in Hamburg. In addition to the changes done in the layout and allocation of lodging space, adjustments were also made to the basic ship systems, such as fitting of new boilers. Moreover, the ship was painted white with Sud- Atlantique's coat of arms decorating the funnels- a red cock, symbol of ancient Gaul, since the Latin name for the cock is the same as the name for Gaul, Gallus.

The extensive repairs and upgrading of SS Kaiser Friedrich into SS Burdigala had taken longer than initially planned resulting in delayed delivery of the ship. Which was supposed to become operational on 22 September 1912. Realizing that under the circumstances Sud-Atlantique would not be able to fulfill the terms of the contract signed with the French Government, decided to charter the SS Atlantique from the Messageries Maritimes, with which the company finally managed to make its first scheduled trip on time.

After completion of the restoration work, SS Burdigala sailed from Hamburg to Bordeaux, where she was welcomed with great enthusiasm, considering that she was the largest and fastest ship in service at the South Atlantic at the time. She would maintain this honorary title for a whole year. On 26 September 1912, the inclusion of SS Burdigala in the fleet of Cie de Navigation Sud-Atlantique was celebrated with a luxurious dinner on board. Nine days later on 5 October, Burdigala had set off on its first journey with Buenos Aires as its final destination, flying the flag of Sud-Atlantique on her mast.

 Burdigalas further career 
Although the trip had gone on uneventfully, during its return the ship experienced some mechanical problems which resulted in dry docking for additional repair work as soon as she had arrived in Bordeaux. For the time that the SS Burdigala had remained inactive, Cie Sud-Atlantique was forced to replace the ship with the SS La Gascogne, a ship they had chartered from the French Line.

This fact combined with the Burdigalas enormous coal consumption, had led the Sud-Atlantique to the conclusion that the relation between the high operation cost of this lavish ship and the earnings derived was not profitable for the company. Nevertheless, Sud-Atlantique had to wait further until the delivery of the new ships they had ordered before being in a position to withdraw the cost-ineffective SS Burdigala from its fleet.

On 10 November 1912, SS Burdigala embarked on her second trip. This time she had managed to remain on track without any major problems, apart from grounding in a sandy shore of the river Garonne at the port of Bordeaux, following the dragging of the ship's anchors. Over the short period of time that Burdigala served the southern Atlantic line, she evolved into a rather distinguished persona of maritime communications between mainland France and South America. To this day, one can find post cards of Sud-Atlantique with the ship's photograph in many private collections that the emigrants were sending to their home countries to let their families know that they had arrived safely at their destination.

On some of these photos, Burdigala is shown with its hull painted white, which coincided with the ship's "white period", a phase when she had first begun her career under the ownership of Cie Sud-Atlantique; on other photos the hull is painted black with a white strip around the gunwale. The latter refers to the second half of the year 1913, when the decision was made for all Cie Sud-Atlatique's vessels to be painted in this way.

On 1 November 1913, SS Burdigala was decommissioned and she remained mothballed yet again at the port of Bordeaux until the breakout of the First World War.

 World War I 
Immediately after the start of the First World War and the general mobilization, which France declared on 3 August 1914, many ships of the merchant fleet were commandeered by the French government. Among them were also ships of Compagnie de Navigation Sud-Atlantique. SS Burdigala was called for war service on 18 August 1914

The French government initially used Burdigala as a simple troop carrier in service from the French Mediterranean city of Toulon to the Dardanelles and to Thessaloniki port in northern Greece. In December 1915 Burdigala was designated as an auxiliary cruiser and equipped with Q.F. Firearms and four 140 mm caliber (5.5 inches) cannons, which were placed in pairs, at the bow and stern.

With the commandeering of SS Burdigala begins the fourth and last period of the history of the ship. The problems faced by the previous owners, namely the companies Norddeutscher Lloyd and Compagnie de Navigation Sud-Atlantique, primarily among these being the heavy consumption of coal fuel, seems not to play a significant role during this period since the French government used every available vessel to support its military actions in the Balkan war theater, and certainly issues of fuel economy was not in its priorities.

From 1915 to 1916, up to her time of sinking, the ship continued to carry troops to the Dardanelles and Thessaloniki, which was the base of the Entente allied forces. The route followed from Toulon passing south of Sardinia and Sicily, and with a first stop in La Valletta, Malta, continuing and rounding the Cape Malea on to Piraeus and from there through the Kea Channel to the Thessaloniki port. At this point Greece, until the declaration of war against the combined German, Austro-Hungarian, Bulgarian and Turkish forces on 25 November 1916 by the Eleftherios Venizelos government, had remained neutral and any actions on its territory and seas was the case, at least theoretically, among those forces engaged in the war.

 Sinking 
On 13 November 1916 the ship sailed empty from Thessaloniki, Greece destined for Toulon, France, for loading more troops and war materials. Captained by Cdr François Rolland and the chief engineer Auguste Richard. While the ship had taken a 4 degrees list and the captain hoped that she will sink within 20 minutes, later on the situation changed as the water penetrated into the second boiler room ahead of the engines. The list of SS Burdigala increased and the captain ordered to abandon ship. Immediately the crew, under the supervision of the captain, the chief engineer and the second officer Mercier, launched the lifeboats in the water and abandoned the ship. 15 minutes after the "abandon ship" order was given, Burdigala, broke in two by a second explosion and sank off the northwest coast of Kea to a depth of 70 meters.

The survivors of SS Burdigala were rescued by the British destroyer  and were transported that same afternoon to Piraeus port. Later they were transferred on board the French flagship, Battleship Provence, and first aid services were provided. According to eyewitness reports, the statement by the commanding officer of the auxiliary cruiser SS Burdigala, Lt. Cdr François Rolland, there was only a single loss of the young engineer Nicolas Losco. (Losco, 22 years old, born on 22 November 1893 in Marseilles, France, died from burns which he suffered after a steam pipe burst in the boiler room at the time of the explosion.)

It was speculated that the ship didn't hit a mine but was torpedoed, according to an eyewitness "The Captain, although he realized that the ship was sinking, he ordered his gunner to open fire against a submarine, her periscope still visible. Thus about 15 cannon rounds were fired, but is unknown if they hit the target". The official position of the French Government as submitted by 15 October 1919 which mentions that the SS Burdigala, "torpedoed on November 14, 1916 in the Zea Canal, aborted after having cannoned the enemy's periscope until the last minute. His (referring to Capt. Rolland) crew gave a fine example of energy and self-sacrifice."  Based on this position and the account of Cdr Rolland in the official report of the incident, that "the submarine dived immediately and the periscope disappeared soon after its detection". The French Government awarded in 1919 to Cdr François Rolland, to the second officer Ernest Mercier, to the Chief Engineer Auguste Richard and to other members of the SS Burdigala crew, the medal of honor Ordre de l'Armée''.

Wreck 
The wreck lies close to Kea's harbour and lies upright on the seabed, depth is 60 meters at the deck. The wreck is on the opposite side of Kea from the wreck of the hospital ship

References

Ships built in Danzig
Ocean liners
Ships sunk by mines
Ships sunk by German submarines in World War I
World War I shipwrecks in the Aegean Sea
Ships of Germany
Ships of France
1897 ships
Maritime incidents in 1916
Ships of Norddeutscher Lloyd
Ships built by Schichau